"Give Me the Light" is a 1996 song recorded by British, Italy based Eurodance artist Ice MC, featuring vocals by Italian singer Valentina Ducros. Produced by German Eurodance project Masterboy, it was released as the first single from Ice MC's fourth album, Dreadatour (1996). It was a moderate hit in Europe, peaking within the Top 30 in Austria, Finland, France and Italy. On the Eurochart Hot 100, it peaked at number 51 in July 1996. A music video was also produced to promote the single.

Critical reception
Pan-European magazine Music & Media wrote, "With a crafty production and strong chorus, this US-born, Italy-residing artist once again proves that he is one of the prime exponents of the Euro-dance scene."

Track listing
 12" single, Italy
"Give Me the Light" (Cold as Ice Mix)
"Give Me the Light" (Club Mix)

 CD single, France
"Give Me the Light" (The Light) – 3:51
"Give Me the Light" (Club Mix) – 5:44

 CD maxi, Germany
"Give Me the Light" (Radio Edit) – 3:51
"Give Me the Light" (Air Cut) – 3:56
"Give Me the Light" (Tek Time Mix) – 5:44
"Give Me the Light" (Club Mix) – 5:23
"Give Me the Light" (Instrumental) – 4:19

 CD maxi (Remixes), Germany
"Give Me the Light" (Chico Y Chico 7" Latino Remix) – 3:41
"Give Me the Light" (Chico Y Chico Latino Club Remix) – 5:39
"Give Me the Light" (Brain Progressive Summer Mix) – 4:55
"Give Me the Light" (Unit Mix) – 4:30

Charts

References

 

1996 singles
1996 songs
Ice MC songs
Song articles with missing songwriters